Eupithecia coaequalis is a moth in the  family Geometridae. It is found in Zimbabwe.

References

Moths described in 1933
coaequalis
Moths of Africa